Timeline of particle physics technology

 1896 - Charles Wilson discovers that energetic particles produce droplet tracks in supersaturated gases
 1897-1901 - Discovery of the Townsend discharge by John Sealy Townsend
 1908 - Hans Geiger and Ernest Rutherford use the Townsend discharge principle to detect alpha particles. 
 1911 - Charles Wilson finishes a sophisticated cloud chamber
 1928 - Hans Geiger and Walther Muller invent the Geiger Muller tube, which is based upon the gas ionisation principle used by Geiger in 1908, but is a practical device that can also detect beta and gamma radiation. This is implicitly also the invention of the Geiger Muller counter. 
 1934 - Ernest Lawrence and Stan Livingston invent the cyclotron
 1945 - Edwin McMillan devises a synchrotron
 1952 - Donald Glaser develops the bubble chamber
 1968 - Georges Charpak and Roger Bouclier build the first multiwire proportional mode particle detection chamber

Particle physics
Particle physics
Particle physics